William Garrett (February 6, 1842 – December 30, 1916) was a Manx-born American soldier who fought in the American Civil War. Garrett received his country's highest award for bravery during combat, the Medal of Honor. Garrett's medal was won for his actions in the Battle of Nashville in Nashville, Tennessee, on December 16, 1864. He was honored with the award on February 24, 1865.

Garrett was born on the Isle of Man, entered service in Chardon, Ohio, and was buried in Leavenworth National Cemetery.

Medal of Honor citation

See also
List of American Civil War Medal of Honor recipients: G–L

References

1842 births
1916 deaths
American Civil War recipients of the Medal of Honor
Manx emigrants to the United States
19th-century Manx people
Union Army officers
United States Army Medal of Honor recipients
20th-century Manx people